King George Packet was launched in 1802 in Berwick-on-Tweed for the Old Shipping Company of Berwick. She sailed as a packet between Leith and London until 1825, when she became a Leith-based coaster. She then was unlisted for two years, reappearing in 1828 with new owners. She sailed between London and the Continent and was last listed in 1833.

Career
Berwick smacks were sloops that could make the voyage between Berwick and London in two days.

King George Packet first appeared in Lloyd's Register (LR) in 1802.

Fate
King George Packet was last listed in 1833.

Notes

Citations

References

1802 ships
Age of Sail merchant ships of England
Packet (sea transport)